Eyes Closed EP is a studio EP by American hip hop musician Alias. It was released on Anticon in 2003.

The EP is his first instrumental-only release.

Track listing

References

External links
 

Anticon EPs
Instrumental hip hop EPs
2003 EPs